TransferMate is a B2B payments technology which was founded in 2010. It is headquartered in Kilkenny, Ireland, and has other offices in San Francisco, New York and Sydney. According to the company, as of late 2017, over $11 billion had been transferred through TransferMate's Technology. TransferMate's network of payment transfer systems is licensed and regulated in all 50 US states, Canada, Australia, New Zealand and in Europe.

History
TransferMate was launched in 2008 by Terry Clune and Barry Dowling, a company under the Clune Technology Group (Formerly The Taxback Group), which includes 6 other sister companies. Starting in 2008, the company expanded to 185 employees by late 2017. As of 2020, the company's website stated that it had over 1,400 staff working from 22 countries.

Instead of using intermediary banks to make transfers, TransferMate set up their own accounts, with the intent to allow the company to transfer funds through their own banking network. According to the company, TransferMate is regulated in the US, Canada, Australia, New Zealand and Europe.

The company created a FinTech (financial technology) system to allow their customers to make cross border transfers online,  this allows them to receive funds locally and make payments locally with the intention to eliminate the need for intermediary banks and international transfer fees. TransferMate’s technology has been incorporated in to other financial systems such as  QuickBooks, SAP Concur and Tradeshift.

In November 2017, Allied Irish Banks invested €30m in the organisation.

In July 2018, ING Bank invested €21m, valuing TransferMate at €350m. ING Bank is also a partner, introducing TransferMate payment solutions to ING corporate clients. 

Further funding of $70 million, by a UK pension fund, was announced in May 2022. A spokesperson for the company said this additional funding would "allow us to accelerate our mission to drive innovation".

Recognition

The company and software won the Big Innovation Award 2016 for Most Innovative Payment Solutions, eirSpiders 2015: Best in Financial Services, 2016 USA-Ireland Research Innovation Award, and Financial Innovation Awards in 2016. Moneyfacts consumer awards 2017: highly commended in Best Consumer Service provider and International Money Transfer Provider of the year. Kilkenny Chamber of Commerece 2017: Overall Winner   Fintech 20 Ireland   The Germany Trade & Invest Award for International Expansion Stevie Awards: Financial Technology Bronze winner  IEA Exporter Awards: High potential Exporter award 2018

References 

Online remittance providers
Electronic funds transfer
Foreign exchange companies
Financial services companies established in 2008
Irish companies established in 2008